Yves Pires is a French artist born in Choisy le Roi, France where one of his sculptures, “Elodie”, can now be seen in the neighbourhood of Seine et Parc. He dedicates himself exclusively to his greatest passion which is sculpture, mainly working with bronze. He was born in 1958.

Early life and education
Of a shy nature in his early years, he took refuge in drawing and explored his inner world of imagination and discovery. He took an early interest in fine art and at age 16 copied a painting of Vermeer, The Young Girl with Turban, also perhaps more commonly known as the Girl with a Pearl Earring. He then explored a variety of media including drawing, engraving, silk screen printing, sculpture and casting and left art school at the age of 19.

Artistic career
After art school he set about learning building technology alongside his father with whom he worked for a dozen years renovating apartments. He then became a set decorator for television series like Les Muscle or Helene et les Garcons.  He also collaborated on a project for France2 relating to the production of a made-for-television movie adapted from “20,000 Leagues Under the Sea” by Jules Verne and also did the stage design for a show by Sylvie Vartan.

Interviews
He was the featured artist of the month in the magazine Gestion de Fortune and interviewed by Maurice-J. Estrade in October 2004, and again in May 2009.
He was profiled in La Republique Du Centre on Monday February 5, 2007.
He was featured in the Choisy Infos in May 2008.

Influences
He cites among his influences Michelangelo for sensuality, Rodin for the life, strength and passion with which he was able to infuse his sculptures. Others that he admires are Camille Claudel, Carpeaux, Bugatti, as well as Canova, Houdon, Barye, and Rude. The photography of Doisneau, Weston, Herb Ritts, Elliott Erwitt are a continuing source of inspiration.
In his sculpture he often represents femininity in its expression of sensuality, and with its gentleness of desire.

Work
Some of his better known work includes sculptures such as:
Sensualite,
Le Saut,
La Grande Panthere,
Aurore,
Esperance,
Alena,
Esa,
Masha

Exhibitions
His work has been exposed extensively including a permanent exhibition.

1999 to 2005 GALERIE GERARD MAILLET
Galerie de l'Estrade
2005 - EXPOSITION PORTE DE VINCENNES
2005 - GRAND MARCHE D'ART CONTEMPORAIN BASTILLE

AMBER ART GALERY - Salon "PAN AMSTERDAM" HOLLANDE
November 2005
November 2006
November 2007
November 2008

AMBER ART GALERY - Salon HERTOGENBOSCH - HOLLANDE
April 2006
April 2007
April 2008
April 2009

Galerie Hoche - VERSAILLES
May 2006

Galerie Hoche HOTEL DE PARIS - MONACO
December 2006

Guest of Honour at the SALON DES PEINTRES DU BOCAGE - FLERS
November 2007

GALERIE DU REGARD - SAINT PAUL DE VENCE
March 2007

GALERIE BARTOUX - MEGEVE
July 2007

GALERIE PAULETTE BOSSE - DEN HAAG
November 2007
Guest of Honour at the 74ème SALON de la
SOCIETE DES BEAUX ARTS DE CHOISY LE ROI
March 2009

GALERIE BERTHELLOT - PARIS
May 2009

Galerie CEDRIC - ESTRADE
December 2009
GALERIE NEEL Cannes
May 2009
May 2010
May 2011

GALERIE ARTCLUB PARIS - EXPOSITIONS PERMANENTES
Permanent exposition from February 2005 to present
Events:
February 2009
December 2010
February 2012

GALERIE CLARUS - LIGNY LE RIBAULT
June to July 2010
June to July 2011

Banque BARCLAY'S - ORLEANS
April 2011

GALERIE PHAROS - MARSEILLE
March 2011

MERCEDES / BENZ CENTER - RUEIL MALMAISON
EXPOSITION ART ANIMALIER
March 2012

GALERIE ARTCLUB - LYON
December 2012

External links
 Artist website
 Art viewing with several of Yves's sculptures
 Gazette artvideo.com

References

1958 births
Living people
20th-century French sculptors
French male sculptors
21st-century French sculptors
21st-century French male artists
People from Val-de-Marne